The 2005 season was the New England Patriots' 36th in the National Football League (NFL), their 46th overall and their sixth under head coach Bill Belichick. With a Week 6 loss to the Denver Broncos, the Patriots failed to either improve or match their 14–2 record from last season; they finished with a 10–6 record and the division title before losing in the playoffs to the Broncos, ending their hopes of becoming the first NFL team to three peat in the Super Bowl.

Ten days after earning a victory in Super Bowl XXXIX, linebacker Tedy Bruschi suffered a stroke and initially planned on missing the entire season; Bruschi returned to the field against the Buffalo Bills on October 30. Cornerback Ty Law was released in the offseason, and injuries at cornerback, as well as a season-ending injury to safety Rodney Harrison in Week 3, forced the Patriots to start a number of players in the secondary early in the season. Overall, injuries caused the Patriots to start 45 different players at one point or another during the season, an NFL record for a division champion (breaking the record of 42 set by the Patriots in 2003).

Beginning the season with a 4–4 record, the Patriots lost their first game at home since 2002 against the San Diego Chargers in Week 4. The team ended the season on a 6–2 run to finish 10–6, earning their third straight AFC East title. (The Patriots were the first team in NFL history to alternate wins and losses in each of their first nine games.)

With the fourth seed in the AFC playoffs, the Patriots defeated the Jacksonville Jaguars in the wild card round but fell to the Denver Broncos on the road in the divisional round, committing five turnovers in the game and marking the first playoff loss in the Brady/Belichick era. Thus, it would begin a stretch, unbroken as of the 2022 season, in which the defending NFL champions have failed to defend their Super Bowl title.

Offseason

Tedy Bruschi suffers a stroke
On February 16, 2005, three days after playing in the 2005 Pro Bowl in Honolulu, Hawaii, linebacker Tedy Bruschi suffered a mild stroke while at his home in North Attleborough, Massachusetts. Bruschi, who awoke to blurred vision and temporary numbness, was rushed to Massachusetts General Hospital after a 9-1-1 call by his wife, Heidi. Without any long-term effects, Bruschi underwent heart surgery to repair a congenital condition in his heart known as an atrial septal defect.

Bruschi announced his intentions to sit out the 2005 season on July 20, while still citing his ongoing health improvement following the stroke. Following this announcement, Bruschi was placed on the Physically Unable to Perform list, keeping him inactive for a minimum of six games to begin the 2005 campaign. This is particularly notable, as the Patriots decided to forgo placing Bruschi on the injured reserve list, which would have prohibited him from playing in any 2005 games. With the window left open for his return, Bruschi returned to the practice field on October 19, during the Patriots' bye week. Only three months after announcing his plans to sit out the entire season, Bruschi returned to the Patriots for their next game against the Buffalo Bills on October 30. Bruschi would go on to play the rest of the season, only missing the Patriots' final game of the regular season as well as their first playoff game due to a leg injury.

Staff changes
Bill Belichick lost both of his coordinators following the 2004 season. Offensive coordinator Charlie Weis left to become head coach at the University of Notre Dame, while defensive coordinator Romeo Crennel was named head coach of the Cleveland Browns. Belichick only replaced Crennel for the 2005 season, promoting defensive backs coach Eric Mangini to defensive coordinator. Assistant offensive line and tight ends coach Jeff Davidson followed Crennel to Cleveland, and was replaced as tight ends coach by Pete Mangurian and as assistant offensive line coach by offensive coaching assistant Matt Patricia. Also departing was assistant strength and conditioning coach Markus Paul, who was replaced by former Canadian Football League star Harold Nash, and defensive coaching assistant Cory Undlin, who followed Crennel to the Browns as a defensive quality control coach. Undlin was replaced as a defensive coaching assistant by Mike Judge. Former assistant running backs/wide receivers coach Joel Collier rejoined the staff as an assistant defensive backs coach.

In the front office, Senior Vice President and Chief Operating Officer Andy Wasynczuk left the organization to join Harvard Business School. Assistant Director of College Scouting Lionel Vital and Assistant Director of Pro Scouting Keith Kidd also departed; Vital became a national scout with the Baltimore Ravens, while Kidd joined ESPN.com.

Departures
Free agency saw the departure of only one full-time starter from 2004, offensive guard Joe Andruzzi, who signed with the Cleveland Browns. However, three-time Pro Bowl defensive back Ty Law was released in a salary cap move and would stay in the division, signing with the New York Jets. Veteran linebacker Roman Phifer, who had started on all three of the Patriots' Super Bowl teams, was also released, along with nose tackle Keith Traylor. Long-time Patriot linebacker Ted Johnson was a surprise departure, retiring on the eve of training camp. Other free agency departures were Adrian Klemm (Green Bay Packers) and David Patten (Washington Redskins).

Arrivals

Unlike past Patriots offseasons, the 2005 offseason did not bring the arrival of any would-be full-time starters. Linebackers Chad Brown and Monty Beisel started six games together to begin the season, but both were benched in favor of Mike Vrabel and Tedy Bruschi, after returning from his stroke. Veteran quarterback and New England native Doug Flutie returned to the Patriots for the final season of his career, having last played for them in 1989. In November, facing multiple injuries to their defensive backfield, the Patriots signed veteran defensive back Artrell Hawkins, who would go on to start six games, including both of the Patriots' playoff games. Other arrivals were Chad Scott, Wesly Mallard, Tim Dwight, Antuan Edwards, Chad Morton, and David Terrell, but only Scott and Dwight finished the season with the Patriots.

Free agents or potential free agents Brandon Gorin, Patrick Pass, Stephen Neal, Tom Ashworth, Don Davis, David Givens, Jarvis Green, and Troy Brown (after being released) were all re-signed, while Tom Brady, Mike Vrabel, and Green all received long-term contract extensions. Defensive lineman Richard Seymour held out for the first four days of training camp but returned after receiving a raise. Kicker Adam Vinatieri signed and played the full season under his franchise tag tender.

On March 4, the Patriots traded a third-round pick and a fifth-round pick in the 2005 NFL Draft to the Arizona Cardinals for defensive back Duane Starks and a fifth-round pick in the 2005 draft. Starks started six-straight games for the Patriots before being placed on injured reserve in November. Also, during the preseason, the Patriots traded their fifth-round pick in the 2006 NFL Draft to the Cleveland Browns for wide receiver André Davis, who started four games for the Patriots in 2005 after being released and re-signed.

2005 NFL draft

Staff

Opening training camp roster
As of the Patriots' first training camp practice at Gillette Stadium on July 29, they had 79 players signed to their roster, one short of the NFL maximum of 80 players. Richard Seymour did not count against the limit as he held out of the start of training camp and was placed on the Reserve/Did Not Report list. Michael McGrew also did not count against the limit after being waived/injured the day before training camp began. Finally, the Patriots received seven total roster exemptions for the NFL Europe allocations of Ricky Bryant, Kory Chapman, Joel Jacobs, Cedric James, and Grant Steen (one for each player, plus two bonus exemptions because of the time Chapman and James spent on practice squads in 2004).

2005 New England Patriots Schedule

Preseason

Regular season

Postseason schedule

Week 1 roster

Regular season results

Week 1

    
    
    
    
    
    
    
    

Coming off their second straight Super Bowl win, the Patriots and Gillette Stadium played host to the extravagant NFL kickoff celebration and the Oakland Raiders. The reality of the new season would hit the Patriots hard on the game's first drive, with a long catch by Randy Moss setting up a 2-yard touchdown catch from Kerry Collins to tight end Courtney Anderson. The Patriots would respond with an Adam Vinatieri field goal, and then take the lead on an 18-yard touchdown reception by reigning Super Bowl MVP Deion Branch. In the second quarter, Moss tore through the Patriots' secondary again, this time taking a 73-yard catch the distance for a touchdown. The Patriots would re-take the lead on the next drive when Brady hit Tim Dwight on a 5-yard scoring strike. After a Jarvis Green strip-sack of Collins was recovered by Vince Wilfork deep in Raiders' territory, the Patriots expanded their lead on an 8-yard Corey Dillon touchdown run. In the fourth quarter, Dillon ran for a 2-yard touchdown that gave the Patriots a 30–14 lead. Following a blocked Josh Miller punt, the Raiders had the ball in Patriots territory and capitalized, with Collins completing a 5-yard touchdown pass to Anderson. The Patriots then ran out the clock to secure a 30–20 opening victory.

Week 2

Week 3

In a much-anticipated re-match of the previous season's AFC Championship game, the Patriots traveled to Heinz Field to face the Steelers.

After the Patriots took an early lead on a 4-yard Corey Dillon touchdown run, the Steelers responded when Ben Roethlisberger connected with Hines Ward on an 85-yard touchdown catch the very next play. The Steelers took a lead on a Jeff Reed field goal and then recovered a Kevin Faulk fumble deep in Steelers' territory.

Roethlisberger would then hit Antwaan Randle El on a 49-yard play, but Randle El would unsuccessfully attempt a lateral to Ward at the Patriots' 11-yard line, which was recovered by the Patriots. Brady would make a second foray into the Steelers' red zone late in the first half, but the Patriots would again come up short when Brady's pass was tipped and intercepted by the Steelers.

The struggles would continue for the Patriots in the third quarter, which Vinatieri missing a field goal before Faulk fumbled for the second time in the game, recovered by the Steelers, who then took a 13–7 lead on a field goal.

The game then turned in the Patriots' favor, with Vinatieri hitting a field goal before Brady mounted an 86-yard scoring drive that ended in Dillon's second touchdown of the day, giving the Patriots the lead.

Another Vinatieri field goal proved important, as the Steelers tied the game on a 4-yard Roethlisberger-to-Ward strike with just over a minute remaining. With seconds remaining, the Patriots drove into Steelers territory and Vinatieri's 43-yard field goal attempt was good, sealing a 23–20 Patriots victory.

The win would prove costly for the Patriots, though, who lost starting tackle Matt Light and safety Rodney Harrison to season-ending injuries.

Week 4

This was New England's first home loss since Week 16 in 2002 against the Jets, snapping a franchise-record 18-game home winning streak in the regular season.

Week 5

Week 6

Week 8

This game marked the return of Tedy Bruschi, who had sat out the whole season due to a stroke suffered in February (see above)

Week 9

The undefeated Colts and quarterback Peyton Manning traveled to Foxboro looking for their first win there since 1995. In the spotlight of Monday Night Football, the Patriots defense proved unable to control the Colts offense as they had done in a 20–3 showing in the last matchup between the two teams; Manning and Marvin Harrison connected on a 48-yard catch on the game's second play, which was followed by a 1-yard touchdown grab by Harrison. Tom Brady and the Patriots responded by mounting a long drive that ended in a 16-yard touchdown catch by Deion Branch. The Patriots defense though, proved ineffective at stopping the Colts on third down, giving up a 17-play drive that ended in a 2-yard touchdown run by Edgerrin James. On their next drive, a Mike Vrabel interception of Manning gave the Patriots good field position, only to be squandered by a Corey Dillon fumble at the Colts' 18-yard line. To close the first half, Manning led the Colts on another scoring drive, connecting with Reggie Wayne on a 10-yard touchdown pass. The Colts' offense continued to dominate in the second half, taking a 28–7 lead after Dominic Rhodes ended an 11-play drive with a 4-yard touchdown run. Brady responded with a 31-yard touchdown pass to Daniel Graham, but the Colts' offense kept scoring, adding two Mike Vanderjagt field goals into the fourth quarter; the first came after the Patriots unsuccessfully tried to catch the Colts off-guard with an on-side kick. Down 20 points, Brady mounted another scoring drive, this time hitting Troy Brown on a 19-yard touchdown strike to cut the Colts' lead to 34–21. The Colts would come right back to crush the Patriots' hopes of a comeback, with Manning hitting Harrison on a 30-yard touchdown pass. Veteran Doug Flutie replaced Brady in the game's final minutes as the Colts came out of Foxboro with a decisive 40–21 victory.

Week 10

Week 11

Week 12

This was the first Patriots game for Bill Belichick after the death of his father, Steve Belichick, former fullback, college coach, and long-time scout at the U.S. Naval Academy.

Week 13

Brady was held without a touchdown pass for the third time in the previous two seasons and Adam Vinatieri surpassed Gino Cappelletti as the Patriots' all-time leader in points. Vinatieri would finish his Patriots career with 1,158 and remained the franchise's all-time points leader until his successor, Stephen Gostkowski, surpassed him in Week 15 of the Patriots' 2014 championship season.

Week 14

Week 15

Week 16

Week 17

Doug Flutie converted a drop kick for an extra point for the first time since the 1941 NFL Championship Game.

Standings

Standings breakdown

Postseason results

Wild Card

    
    
    
    
    

The three-time Super Bowl champion Patriots, who for the first time in their previous three playoff trips would have to win three games to advance to the Super Bowl, defeated the Jaguars 28–3. Linebacker Willie McGinest set NFL playoff records for sacks in a game (4.5, 1 sack ahead of the old record held by Richard Dent and Rich Milot) and career postseason sacks (16, two ahead of the old record held by Bruce Smith), while quarterback Tom Brady threw for 201 yards and three touchdown passes.

In the first half, the Jaguars recorded four sacks and held New England to 126 yards, while the Patriots defense recorded two sacks, gave up only 115 yards, and didn't allow a first down until 9:40 remained in the second period. Neither team could score in the first quarter, but early in the second, New England receiver Tim Dwight returned Chris Hanson's 46-yard punt 27 yards to the Jaguars' 37-yard line. Two 4-yard runs by Corey Dillon and an 18-yard burst from Kevin Faulk then moved the ball to the 11-yard line, and Brady capped off the drive with an 11-yard touchdown pass to Troy Brown. On Jacksonville's ensuing possession, Jimmy Smith's 19-yard reception his team a first down for the first time in the game and moved the ball to the Patriots' 44-yard line. But on the next play, a tackle from safety Eugene Wilson caused Alvin Pearman to fumble the ball, and defensive lineman Richard Seymour recovered it. However, the Patriots could not take advantage of the turnover; Jacksonville managed to force a punt and then drove into scoring range for the first time in the game. Quarterback Byron Leftwich completed five passes for 59 yards on the drive, and Josh Scobee finished it with a 36-yard field goal, cutting their deficit to 7–3. After the kickoff, Faulk's 21-yard reception moved the ball to midfield and gave the Patriots a chance to increase their lead before halftime, but receiver Deion Branch dropped a pass from Brady at the Jaguars' 10-yard line with 19 seconds left.

After forcing Jacksonville to punt on the opening drive of the second half, Brady led the Patriots 81 yards in 12 plays. On the 11th play, they nearly turned the ball over when tight end Benjamin Watson fumbled the ball on the Jaguars' 5-yard line, but receiver André Davis recovered the ball, and Brady threw a 3-yard touchdown pass to David Givens on the next play. Then after forcing a punt, Brady threw a short pass to Watson who broke several tackles en route to a 63-yard score, increasing New England's lead to 21–3. After the kickoff, Leftwich led his team to the Patriots' 32-yard line, but on the first play of the fourth quarter, defensive back Asante Samuel intercepted Leftwich's pass and took off for a 73-yard touchdown return, making the score 28–3. After that, Jacksonville mounted two more drives, but could not come away with any points. First they drove to the Patriots' 8-yard line. But on third down and 2, McGinest sacked Leftwich for a 15-yard loss and Scobee missed a 41-yard field goal attempt on the next play. Then after forcing a punt, they drove to the Patriots' 6-yard line, but ended up turning the ball over downs with 5 minutes left in the game.

This game also marked three career playoff records: Brady and Patriots head coach Bill Belichick set records for 10 straight postseason victories, eclipsing Vince Lombardi's run with the Green Bay Packers in the 1960s.

Divisional

    
    
    
    
    
    
    
    

The Broncos converted four out of five turnovers into 24 points as they eliminated the two-time defending Super Bowl champion Patriots, 27–13, and won their first playoff game since defeating the Atlanta Falcons in Super Bowl XXXIII. This game also ended New England's league-record ten-game postseason winning streak and gave quarterback Tom Brady his first ever postseason loss.

Early in the second quarter, the Broncos drove to the Patriots' 3-yard line, only to turn the ball over on downs after failing to convert a fourth down and 1 on New England's 3-yard line. Then after forcing a punt, Broncos quarterback Jake Plummer threw a pass that was intercepted by Asante Samuel. On the next play, Patriots quarterback Tom Brady threw a 51-yard completion to André Davis, setting up Adam Vinatieri's 40-yard field goal to give New England a 3–0 lead.

With New England leading 3–0 with less than two minutes left in the first half, Broncos linebacker Ian Gold recovered a fumble from Kevin Faulk on the Patriots' 40-yard line. After that, a pass interference penalty on Samuel moved the ball to the 1-yard line, and then Mike Anderson scored a 1-yard touchdown run on the next play. On the ensuing kickoff, Ellis Hobbs fumbled that and kicker Todd Sauerbrun recovered the ball on the Patriots' 39-yard line, setting up kicker Jason Elam's 50-yard field goal to give Denver a 10–3 halftime lead.

Early in the third quarter, the Patriots drove 58 yards in 11 plays and scored with a 32-yard field goal from Vinatieri, cutting their deficit to 10–6. With less than a minute to go in the third quarter, New England reached the Denver 5-yard line. However, Brady was intercepted for the first time in the playoffs since Super Bowl XXXVIII. The interception was returned by Champ Bailey for 101 yards before New England tight end Benjamin Watson knocked the ball out of bounds at the New England 1-yard line. The Patriots challenged whether the ball was actually knocked through and out of the end zone (which would have been a touchback and given the Patriots the ball at their own 20-yard line), but the original call stood. Mike Anderson then ran for another one-yard touchdown on the next play to increase Denver's lead, 17–6. Then on New England's next drive, the usually accurate Vinatieri missed a 42-yard field goal, his first in 21 field goal attempts in the playoffs. Later in the fourth quarter, Troy Brown muffed a Denver punt and the Broncos recovered it on New England's 15-yard line, setting up Rod Smith's four-yard touchdown pass from Plummer.

With 8:33 left in the game, Brady completed a 73-yard pass to Deion Branch and then followed it up with a 4-yard touchdown pass to David Givens, cutting the score to 24–13. But on the Broncos' ensuing possession, Plummer's 42-yard completion to Smith set up another Elam field goal. Denver then all but clinched the game when safety John Lynch intercepted a Brady pass with less than 3 minutes remaining.

Brady finished the game completing 20 out of 36 passes for 341 yards, one touchdown, and two interceptions, but lost his first NFL postseason game. Also, Patriots head coach Bill Belichick lost his first postseason game since taking over the team in 2000, as both the coach and his quarterback had compiled 10 straight playoff wins before this (the trio of 3–0 runs to Super Bowl titles and the previous win over Jacksonville). Branch caught 8 passes for 153 yards, while Rod Smith caught 6 passes for 96 yards and a touchdown.  This would become the Patriots' first postseason loss since 1998 when the team lost to the Jaguars in the wild card round.

Final roster

Awards and honors
Numerous players were the recipients of awards for their performances in the 2005 regular season:

Pro Bowl selections
Patriots quarterback Tom Brady and defensive end Richard Seymour were both named to the AFC team in the 2006 Pro Bowl. Neither participated in the game due to injuries.

Records
 With his 10-point performance in the Patriots' Week 13 win over the New York Jets, kicker Adam Vinatieri became the Patriots' all-time leading scorer, breaking Gino Cappelletti's mark of 1,130 points.

Notes and references

External links
 Season page on Pro Football Reference

New England Patriots
New England Patriots seasons
AFC East championship seasons
New England Patriots
Sports competitions in Foxborough, Massachusetts